Gjelsvik Peak is a peak,  high, standing  northwest of Mount Fridtjof Nansen, in the Queen Maud Mountains of Antarctica. It was named by the Southern Party of the New Zealand Geological Survey Antarctic Expedition (1961–62) for Tore Gjelsvik, Director of the Norsk Polarinstitutt, Oslo.

References

Mountains of the Ross Dependency
Dufek Coast